Alexander Giannascoli (born February 3, 1993), better known by his stage names Alex G or, formerly, (Sandy) Alex G, is an American musician, producer, and singer-songwriter. He started his career with DIY self-releases on Bandcamp and began building up an audience with his label debut, DSU (2014), released on Orchid Tapes to critical acclaim from various publications. He later signed with Lucky Number, who reissued his earlier releases, Rules and Trick (2012). In 2015, he signed with Domino Recording Company and released his sixth studio album, Beach Music. He followed it in 2017 with Rocket, which received further acclaim and recognition. Giannascoli's eighth studio album, House of Sugar, was released in 2019, and his ninth album God Save the Animals was released on September 23, 2022.

Early life and career
Giannascoli was born in 1993 in Havertown, Pennsylvania At age 11, he learned how to play his brother's guitar and began recording music. While attending Haverford High School, Giannascoli made two albums that he shared with friends. He experimented with different musical styles while making collaborative music, which included the "goth techno" he made with his sister in their band MOTHER, as well as the projects involving his high school band The Skin Cells, described as "pop rock that accidentally ended up being punk". In 2011, Giannascoli enrolled at Temple University, where he studied English in hopes to become a teacher, but eventually dropped out to pursue a musical career.

After self-releasing various albums, EPs, and singles on Bandcamp from 2010 to 2012, Giannascoli's popularity spread through word of mouth, blogs, and reverence by other musicians. The Fader called Giannascoli "the internet's secret best songwriter." This led to Orchid Tapes signing Giannascoli to its roster, as well as the release of his label debut DSU (2014), which garnered acclaim from music critics. Following the release of the album, Giannascoli went on tour throughout North America and Europe. In November, DSU was released by Lucky Number in Europe on all formats with two new bonus tracks. The label later also reissued his two preceding releases, 2012's Rules and Trick.

In 2015, Giannascoli signed with Domino Recording Company and released his debut with the label Beach Music on October 9. The following year, Giannascoli worked with Frank Ocean on his albums Endless and Blonde, providing guitars and arrangements for several songs.

On March 2, 2017, Giannascoli announced that his second album with Domino, titled Rocket, would be released on May 19 and shared the first two singles, "Bobby" and "Witch". On April 4, Giannascoli announced the change of his stage name from Alex G to (Sandy) Alex G, with no further explanation, and shared another single from the album, "Proud". The music publication Spin attributed the name change to a legal conflict with singer and YouTuber Alex Blue, who was operating at the time under the trademarked name "Alex G". On choosing the name 'Sandy', Giannascoli said it "was the first thing [he] put on Bandcamp" and that he had "just used that ‘Sandy’ as a sort of [social media] tag" since then. On May 4, he released two more singles, "Brick" and "Sportstar", before the release of the album. Rocket received acclaim from music critics and appeared on multiple publications' year-end lists of the best albums of 2017.

Giannascoli's eighth studio album, House of Sugar, was released on September 13, 2019. The album received positive reviews and placed 17th on Pitchfork's year-end best albums list. In June 2020, he dropped "(Sandy)" from his stage name, returning to going by Alex G.

Giannascoli scored the film We're All Going to the World's Fair, released on April 8, 2022.

Giannascoli's ninth studio album, God Save the Animals was released on September 23, 2022.

Musical style
Giannascoli's music is often characterized as indie rock with a lo-fi aesthetic due to him recording all of his music by himself in his home. He is frequently compared to singer-songwriter Elliott Smith, who is an influence of his. Other comparisons include Built to Spill and The Martinis. The Philadelphia Inquirer praised him as "a particularly gifted melody writer" whose "fuzzy, sometimes distorted songs, which hark back to slightly askew 1990s bands such as Pavement, can't hide his skill as a pop craftsman and a constructor of elliptical narratives that call for repeated listening." He stated that his creative process consists of him usually working alone in his room with his guitar and adding other instruments later. When asked about working in a professional recording studio, he replied "I feel like I'm eventually going to have to do that, but I just don't want to. Because I don't know how to work all that stuff, and I don't want anyone else to have control. I just want to follow my own ideas, and I'm uncomfortable doing it any other way." Despite being formerly hesitant to record his music in professional studios, Giannascoli's God Save the Animals was studio-recorded with help from Jacob Portrait during the pandemic.

Discography

Studio albums

 Race (2010)
 Winner (2011)
 Rules (2012)
 Trick (2012)
 DSU (2014)
 Beach Music (2015)
 Rocket (2017)
 House of Sugar (2019)
 God Save the Animals (2022)

Soundtrack albums

 We're All Going to the World's Fair (Original Motion Picture Soundtrack) (2022)

References

External links
 
 
 Alex G on YouTube

1993 births
Living people
American indie rock musicians
Musicians from Philadelphia
People from Haverford Township, Pennsylvania
Temple University alumni
Domino Recording Company artists
Third Man Records artists